William John George Napier, 11th Lord Napier, 2nd Baron Ettrick (1846–1913) was a British peer.

Family
William John George Napier was the son of Francis Napier, 10th Lord Napier and Anne Jane Charlotte Lockwood, daughter of Robert Manners Lockwood. In 1867 he married, firstly, Harriet Blake Armstrong Lumb (d. 1897), daughter of Edward Lumb of Wallington Lodge. They had two sons:

Francis Edward Basil Napier, 12th Lord Napier, 3rd Baron Ettrick
The Hon. Frederick William Scott Napier

In 1898 he married, secondly, Grace Burns, third daughter of James Cleland Burns, second son of Sir George Burns, 1st Baronet. With her, he had:

The Hon. Archibald Lennox Colquhoun William George Napier

Notes

|-

William Napier, 11th Lord
1846 births
1913 deaths
Barons in the Peerage of the United Kingdom
Lords Napier
Eldest sons of British hereditary barons